Thailand were the defending champions of the Men's Team competition of the 2011 Southeast Asian Games and successfully defended their title by defeating Indonesia in the final. Each tie was the best of three rubbers, two singles and one doubles match.

Medalists

Draw

Quarterfinals

Semifinals

Gold medal match

References
Draw
Team of Thailand
Team of Indonesia
Team of Vietnam
Team of the Philippines
SEAG2011 Start/Result Lists - Tennis

Women's Team